Illegal in Blue is a 1995 American direct-to-video action, crime film, erotic thriller film directed by Stu Segall and starring Stacey Dash and Dan Gauthier.

Plot
A cop taking personal leave after he witnesses money stolen from the police property room becomes involved with a beautiful singer who may have killed her husband.

Cast
 Stacey Dash as Kari Truitt
 Dan Gauthier as Chris Morgan
 Louis Giambalvo as Lieutenant Cavanaugh
 Trevor Goddard as Mickey Fuller
 Michael Durrell as Michael Snyder
 Sandra Dee Robinson as Joanne
 David Groh as District Attorney Frank 
 Michael Cavanaugh as Lieutenant Lyle

References

1995 films
1990s English-language films
American direct-to-video films
American crime action films
American erotic thriller films
1990s American films